Valerie May Taylor AM (born 9 November 1935) is a conservationist, photographer and filmmaker, and an inaugural member of the diving hall-of-fame. With her husband Ron Taylor, she made documentaries about sharks, and filmed sequences for films including Jaws (1975).

Early life 
Born in Paddington, Sydney on 9 November 1935, Taylor spent her early years in Sydney. Her mother was a housewife and her father an engineer for Exide Batteries. The family moved to New Zealand in 1939 to set up a battery factory there, but were unable to return to Australia when WWII broke out. At 12 years of age Taylor contracted polio during the 1948 polio epidemic. Isolated from her family, friends and schooling she slowly recovered with the support of the ‘Sister Kenny Treatment and Rehabilitation Method’. Taylor fell behind in her studies and left school at 15 years of age to work for the NZ Film Unit drawing for an animation studio.

Taylor returned to Sydney with her family to settle in the beach side suburb of Port Hacking where she started diving in 1956 and took up spearfishing in 1960 to provide food for the family. She became an Australian champion scuba and spearfisher and met her future husband, Ron Taylor, at the St George's Spearfishing Club. They married in December 1963.

Career 
In 1967 a Belgian scientific expedition asked the Taylors' to join their endeavour to record life on the Great Barrier Reef. Over several months, Valerie dove the entire length of the Great Barrier Reef from Lady Elliot Island up to the Torres Strait. Taylor and her husband made documentary films about sharks,
and were the first people to film great white sharks without the protection of a cage. Their work also included Blue Water, White Death in which they swam cageless among a school of oceanic white tip sharks feeding on a whale carcass. The documentary was successful, and attracted the attention of Steven Spielberg, who called on them to shoot the real great white shark sequences for Jaws.

In addition to their work in film, the Taylors have performed conservation work in Australia and elsewhere. They have campaigned to prevent oil exploration in Ningaloo Marine Park, the overturning of mining rights on Coral Sea Islands, the protection of the Great Barrier Reef prior to its being awarded World Heritage status, and they have lobbied for marine sanctuary zones in South Australia.

Taylor has worked as an underwater photographer, and work has appeared in National Geographic Magazine, including some macro images of coral and invertebrates on the Great Barrier Reef that were featured on its front cover in 1973.

During the early 1980s Taylor began experiments with sharks wearing a steel mesh suit. The 1981 front cover of National Geographic magazine featured Taylor, off the coast of California, during one of these experiments with Blue sharks wearing this chainmail suit.

In 1981 Taylor was awarded the NOGI award for Arts, Academy of Underwater Arts & Sciences, presented by the Academy of Underwater Arts and Sciences (AUAS).

In 1986, Taylor was appointed by Prince Bernhard of the Netherlands, the 'Rider of the Order of the Golden Ark' for marine conservation. She was recognised for her successful efforts protecting of the habitat of the potato cod near Lizard Island – the first gazetted protection of the Great Barrier Reef.

She was awarded the 1997 American Nature Photographer of the year award for a picture of a whale shark swimming with her nephew in Ningaloo Marine Park. By 2000 she was inducted into the Women Divers Hall of Fame.

At 66 years old she was still diving with sharks and was awarded the Centenary Medal for service to Australian society in marine conservation and the Australian Senior Achiever of the Year. In 2008 Taylor received the Australian Geographic Lifetime of Conservation award.

In 2010 Taylor was awarded an AM For service to conservation and the environment as an advocate for the protection and preservation of marine wildlife and habitats, particularly the Great Barrier Reef and Ningaloo Reef, and as an underwater cinematographer and photographer.

Taylor's husband Ron died from leukemia in 2012. Taylor remained active in lobbying in favour of marine conservation. She has illustrated and written a children's book, campaigned against ocean plastic pollution overfishing and published her memoirs. In 2014, Valerie campaigned against an Opposition Bill to remove sanctuary zones from marine parks in South Australia.

Work

Documentaries 

Playing with Sharks for Movietone News, 1962
 Shark Hunters, 1963; with Ben Cropp
 Slaughter at Saumarez, 1964
 Skindiving Paradise, 1965
 Revenge of a Shark Victim, 1965; about Rodney Fox (re-edited by Robert Raymond into SHARK which subsequently received a Logie Award)
 Surf Scene, 1965
 Will the Barrier Reef Cure Claude Clough?, 1966
 Belgian Scientific Expedition, for University of Liège 1967
 The Underwater World of Ron Taylor, 1967, narrated live by Ron Taylor
 The Cave Divers, 1967; for W.D. & H.O. Wills (Aust)
 Sharks, 1975; for Time-Life Television
 The Great Barrier Reef, 1978; for Time-Life Television
 The Wreck of the Yongala, 1981
 The Great Barrier Reef (IMAX), 1982; technical consultants
 Operation Shark Bite, 1982
 Give Sharks a Chance, 1991; with Richard Dennison for National Geographic Society and the Australian Broadcasting Corporation
 Shark Shocker 1993 (with Richard Dennison) for Channel 4 UK
 Shadow over the Reef, 1993
 Mystique of the Pearl, for Film Australia, 1995
 Shark Pod, 1996
 Shadow of the Shark, 1999; for Australian Geographic
 Playing with Sharks: The Valerie Taylor Story, 2021;

Television 

 Skippy the Bush Kangaroo, Episode 3 – Golden Reef (1968) – original story & Episode 57 – The Shark Taggers (1969) – underwater sequences
 Contrabandits (30 episode series), 1967–68; underwater sequences and diving instruction for cast
 Barrier Reef (39-episode series), 1971–1972; direction of underwater photography, stunt work and minor acting roles
 Taylor's Inner Space (13-episode series), 1972–1973 with soundtrack composed by Sven Libaek and narration by William Shatner
 Those Amazing Animals, 1980–1981; contributed to underwater segments
 Fortress, 1985; underwater sequences
 Blue Wilderness (6 episodes)1992 cageless shark-diving expedition, 1992; with Richard Dennison for National Geographic and the Australian Broadcasting Corporation
 Flipper, 1995 series; underwater still photography

Films 

 Age of Consent, 1968
 The Intruders (also known as Skippy and the Intruders), 1969
 Blue Water, White Death, 1971
 Jaws, 1975
 Orca, 1976; live shark sequences
 The Last Wave, 1977; underwater sequences
 Jaws 2, 1978
 Gallipoli, 1981; underwater sequences
 A Dangerous Summer, 1982: underwater sequences
 Year of living Dangerously, 1982
 The Blue Lagoon, 1980; underwater sequences
 The Silent One, 1983
 Sky Pirates, 1984, underwater sequences
 Frog Dreaming, 1986
 The Rescue, for Walt Disney, 1987
 Return to the Blue Lagoon, 1990, underwater sequences
 Honeymoon in Vegas, 1991, underwater sequences
 Police Story 4: First Strike, 1995; underwater sequences
 The Island of Dr Moreau, 1995, live shark sequences

Books 

 The Undersea Artistry, 2017, Illustrated
 An Adventurous Life, 2019, Memoirs

Awards and achievements 

 1981 – NOGI award for Arts, Academy of Underwater Arts & Sciences
 1986 – Order of the Golden Ark presented by his Royal Highness, Prince Bernhard of the Netherlands
 1993 – SSI Platinum Pro 5000 Diver
 1997: American Nature Photographer of the year award (sponsored by the American Press Club) for a picture of a whale shark swimming with her nephew in Ningaloo Marine Park
 2000 – membership of the Women Divers Hall of Fame
 2001 – the Centenary Medal and the Australian Senior Achiever of the year
 2010 – Member of the Order of Australia (AM)
2021 - Jackson Wild Legacy Award

Valerie and Ron 
1992 – Australian Geographic Adventurer of the Year
1997 – the jury award for the film Shark Pod at the Antibes Underwater Festival, France
1998 – the Golden Palm Award for the book Blue Wilderness at the 25th World Festival of Underwater Pictures in Antibes, France.
2000 – International Scuba Diving Hall of Fame
2002 – Wildlife Preservation Society of Australia's Serventy Conservation Medal
2008 – Australian Geographic Lifetime of Conservation Award
2011 – Australian Cinematographers Society Hall of Fame
Life membership of the St George Spearfishing & Freediving Club Inc. (date of conferral not stated)
2012 – renaming of the newly declared Neptune Islands Group Marine Park surrounding the Neptune Islands in South Australia to the Neptune Islands Group (Ron and Valerie Taylor) Marine Park

References 

Australian underwater divers
Australian photographers
Living people
Members of the Order of Australia
Australian documentary film directors
1935 births
People from Sydney
Australian women photographers